The 2019 CAA women's soccer tournament was the postseason women's soccer tournament for the Colonial Athletic Association held from November 1 through November 9, 2019. The tournament was held at campus sites, with the higher seed hosting each game. The defending champions were the Hofstra Pride, who successfully defended their title, beating the James Madison Dukes 5–1 in the final.
The conference tournament title was the sixth overall for the Hofstra women's soccer program and the fifth overall for head coach Simon Riddiough.  Both Hofstra and Riddiough have won three straight CAA Tournaments.

Bracket

Source:

Schedule

First Round

Semifinals

Final

Statistics

Goalscorers 
3 Goals
 Sabrina Bryan (Hofstra)

2 Goals
 Lucy Porter (Hofstra)

1 Goal
 Sophie Brause (James Madison)
 Jessica Carrieri (Elon)
 Hannah Coulling (James Madison)
 Haley Crawford (James Madison)
 Sara D'Appolonia (Delaware)
 Ginger Deel (James Madison)
 Riley Dixon (Delaware)
 Hannah Doherty (Elon)
 Megan Fisher (Hofstra)
 Maia Foley (James Madison)
 Audrey Harding (UNC Wilmington)
 Carson Jones (Elon)
 Kayla McCauley (Northeastern)
 Morgan Nanni (UNC Wilmington)
 Iris Rabot (James Madison)
 Lucy Shepherd (Hofstra)
 Anja Suttner (Hofstra)
 Ebony Wiseman (James Madison)

All-Tournament team

Source:

MVP in bold

See also 
 Colonial Athletic Association
 2019 CAA Men's Soccer Tournament

References 

Colonial Athletic Association women's soccer tournament
2019 Colonial Athletic Association women's soccer season